Gustavo Benítez may refer to:

 Gustavo Benítez (footballer, born 1953), Paraguayan defender
 Gustavo Benítez (footballer, born 1986), Argentine centre-back